Ciulucani is a village in Telenești District, Moldova.

Notable people
 Igor Corman

References

Villages of Telenești District